Six Demon Bag is the second album by experimental rock group Man Man, known mainly for their carnivalesque sound and well-received live shows. It received generally favorable reviews and calculated a score of 79 out of 100 on Metacritic based on 17 reviews.

Honus Honus discussed the differences between this album and their first album:

The album was placed on Obscure Sound's list of the best albums of 2006 at number 34 and Pitchfork's list of the top 50 albums of 2006 at number 20.

Pitchfork Media also listed the song "Van Helsing Boombox" as the 350th best song of the 2000s.

A music video for "Engrish Bwudd" was directed by Lindsay Kovnat, and was featured on the Nicktoons Network Animation Festival in 2006.

Man Man planned a tour to celebrate the 10th anniversary of the album's release in 2016 during which they played it start to finish.

Track listing
"Feathers" – 2:08
"Engrish Bwudd" – 3:33
"Banana Ghost" – 2:54
"Young Einstein on the Beach" – 0:58
"Skin Tension" – 3:46
"Black Mission Goggles" – 4:59
"Hot Bat" – 1:26
"Push the Eagles Stomach" – 3:39
"Spider Cider" – 3:05
"Van Helsing Boombox" – 3:44
"Tunneling Through the Guy" – 5:25
"Fishstick Gumbo" – 0:04
"Ice Dogs" – 4:45

Big Trouble in Little China
The album's title comes from a line from Big Trouble in Little China, and refers to a sack that contained the magical tools/potions of Egg Shen as he led Jack Burton, Wang Chi, and the Chang Sing in their desperate attack against the evil Lo Pan.

References

External links
 "Engrish Bwood" video
 "Van Helsing Boombox" mp3
 Six Demon Bag - a trinket item from World of Warcraft

2006 albums
Man Man albums
Ace Fu Records albums